The Symposium on Operating Systems Principles (SOSP), organized by the Association for Computing Machinery (ACM), is one of the most prestigious single-track academic conferences on operating systems.

SOSP is held every other year, alternating with the conference on Operating Systems Design and Implementation (OSDI). The first SOSP was held in 1967. It is sponsored by the ACM's Special Interest Group on Operating Systems (SIGOPS).

History 
The inaugural conference was held in Gatlinburg, Tennessee on 1–4 October 1967 at the Mountain View Hotel. There were fifteen papers in total, of which three presentations were in the Computer Networks and Communications session. Larry Roberts presented his plan for the ARPANET, which at that point was based on Wesley Clark's proposal for a message switching network. Jack Dennis from MIT discussed the merits of a more general data communications network. Roger Scantlebury, a member of Donald Davies' team from the UK National Physical Laboratory, presented their research on packet switching for data communications and mentioned the work of Paul Baran. After the meeting, Scantlebury proposed packet switching for use in the ARPANET and persuaded Roberts that the economics were favorable to message switching. The ARPA team enthusiastically received the idea and Roberts incorporated it into the ARPANET design.

In total, seven conferences out of 28 have been held outside the USA. The first conference held outside the USA was in Saint-Malo, France in 1997. Other countries to have hosted the conference are Canada, the UK, Portugal, China and Germany.

List of conferences 
The conferences are held every two years, beginning in 1967, when the first SOSP conference took place in Gatlinburg, Tennessee.

See also 
 List of computer science conferences

References

External links 
 http://sosp.org/
https://dl.acm.org/conference/sosp

Computer science conferences
Association for Computing Machinery conferences